Norfolk is an independent city in the Commonwealth of Virginia in the United States. Incorporated in 1705, it had a population of 238,005 at the 2020 census, making it the third-most populous city in Virginia after neighboring Virginia Beach and Chesapeake, and the 94th-largest city in the nation.

Norfolk holds a strategic position as the historical, urban, financial, and cultural center of the Hampton Roads region, which has more than 1.8 million inhabitants and is the thirty-third largest Metropolitan Statistical area in the United States. Officially known as Virginia Beach-Norfolk-Newport News, VA-NC MSA, the Hampton Roads region is sometimes called "Tidewater" and "Coastal Virginia"/"COVA," although these are broader terms that also include Virginia's Eastern Shore and entire coastal plain. Named for the eponymous  natural harbor at the mouth of the Chesapeake Bay, Hampton Roads has ten cities, including Norfolk; seven counties in Virginia; and two counties in North Carolina.

Bordered to the west by the Elizabeth River and to the north by the Chesapeake Bay, the city shares land borders with the independent cities of Chesapeake to its south and Virginia Beach to its east. With coastline along multiple bodies of water, Norfolk has many miles of riverfront and bayfront property, including beaches on the Chesapeake Bay.

The coastal zones are important for the economy. The largest naval base in the world, Naval Station Norfolk, is located in Norfolk along with one of NATO's two Strategic Command headquarters. Additionally Norfolk is an important contributor to the Port of Virginia. It is home to Maersk Line, Limited, which manages the world's largest fleet of US-flag vessels. This low-lying coastal infrastructure is very vulnerable to sea level rise, with water levels expected to rise by more than 5.5 feet by the end of the 21st century.

The city has a long history as a strategic military and transportation point, where many railroad lines started. It is linked to its neighbors by an extensive network of interstate highways, bridges, tunnels, and three bridge-tunnel complexes.

History

Before 1607

In the late sixteenth century, the area on which Norfolk now sits was inhabited by the Chesepian people. William Strachey recorded that their settlements were destroyed by the Powhatan shortly before the establishment of Jamestown in 1607.

Colonial Era
Norfolk's lands were some of the first to draw settlers from the Virginia Colony, although Norfolk would not be incorporated as a town until the 1700s. When the establishment of the House of Burgesses introduced representative government to the colony in 1619, governor Sir George Yeardley divided the developed portion the colony into four incorporated jurisdictions, termed citties. The land on which Norfolk now sits fell under Elizabeth Cittie incorporation.

In 1634 King Charles I reorganized the colony into a system of shires, and Elizabeth Cittie became Elizabeth City Shire. After persuading 105 people to settle in the colony, Adam Thoroughgood (who had immigrated to Virginia in 1622 from King's Lynn, Norfolk, England) was granted a large land holding, through the head rights system, along the Lynnhaven River in 1636.

When the South Hampton Roads portion of the shire was separated, Thoroughgood suggested the name of his birthplace for the newly formed New Norfolk County. One year later, it was divided into two counties, Upper Norfolk and Lower Norfolk (the latter now incorporated into the City of Norfolk), chiefly on Thoroughgood's recommendation. This area of Virginia became known as the place of entrepreneurs, including men of the Virginia Company of London.

The House of Burgesses established the "Towne of Lower Norfolk County" in 1680. In 1691, a final county subdivision took place when Lower Norfolk County split to form Norfolk County (included in present-day cities of Norfolk, Chesapeake, and parts of Portsmouth) and Princess Anne County (present-day Virginia Beach).

Norfolk was incorporated in 1705. In 1730, a tobacco inspection site was located here. According to the Tobacco Inspection Act, the inspection was "At Norfolk Town, upon the fort land, in the County of Norfolk; and Kemp's Landing, in Princess Anne, under one inspection." In 1736 George II granted it a royal charter as a borough. By 1775, Norfolk developed into what contemporary observers argued was the most prosperous city in Virginia. It was an important port for exporting goods to the British Isles and beyond. 

Mercantile ties with the British Empire bolstered Norfolk's base of Loyalist support during the early part of the American Revolution but were insufficient to allow the Royal Governor of Virginia John Murray, 4th Earl of Dunmore to make Norfolk his new capital after fleeing Williamsburg in 1775. On New Year's Day, 1776, Lord Dunmore's fleet of three ships shelled the city of Norfolk for more than eight hours. The gunfire, combined with fires started by the British and spread by the Patriots, destroyed more than 800 buildings, constituting nearly two-thirds of the city. Patriot forces destroyed the remaining buildings for strategic reasons the following month. Ultimately, Colonel Woodford drove Dunmore into exile, ending more than 168 years of British rule in Virginia.
 Only the walls of Saint Paul's Episcopal Church survived the bombardment and subsequent fires. A cannonball from the bombardment (fired by the Liverpool) remains within the wall of Saint Paul's.

Nineteenth century

Following recovery from the Revolutionary War's burning, Norfolk and its citizens struggled to rebuild. In 1804, another serious fire along the city's waterfront destroyed some 300 buildings and the city suffered a serious economic setback. In the War of 1812 between America and Great Britain, Norfolk saw action between American militia led by Richard Lawson and the British navy. On July 13, 1813. A British landing party of 8 marines and 16 sailors landed at the beaches of Norfolk to construct a well and gather water. Richard Lawson concealed his company of militia behind a benign looking sandhill. Richard Lawson and his militia sprang their ambush by opening fire from their concealment behind the Sandhills. The British landing party who suffered 3 marines killed surrendered. Richard Lawson who suffered none killed had his militia destroy the British boat, take all provisions, and take the brass cannon. The American militia under Lawson returned to town with their prisoners. During the 1820s, agrarian communities across the American South suffered a prolonged recession, which caused many families to migrate to other areas. Many moved west into the Piedmont, or further into Kentucky and Tennessee. This migration also followed the exhaustion of soil due to tobacco cultivation in the Tidewater, where it had been the primary commodity crop for generations.

Virginia made some attempts to phase out slavery and manumissions increased in the two decades following the war. Thomas Jefferson Randolph gained passage of an 1832 resolution for gradual abolition in the state. However, by that time the increased demand from the settlement of the lower South states had created a large internal market for slavery. The invention of the cotton gin in the late-eighteenth century had made profitable the cultivation of short-staple cotton in the uplands, which was widely practiced.

The American Colonization Society proposed to "repatriate" free blacks and freed slaves to Africa by establishing the new colony of Liberia and paying for transportation. But most African-Americans wanted to stay in their birthplace of the United States and achieve freedom and rights there. For a period, many emigrants to Liberia from Virginia and North Carolina embarked from the port of Norfolk. Joseph Jenkins Roberts, a free person of color native to Norfolk, emigrated via the American Colonization Society and later was elected as the first president of Liberia, establishing a powerful family.

On June 7, 1855, the 183-foot vessel Benjamin Franklin put into Hampton Roads for repairs. The ship had just sailed from the West Indies, where there had been an outbreak of yellow fever. The port health officer ordered the ship quarantined. After eleven days, a second inspection found no issues, so it was allowed to dock. A few days later, the first cases of yellow fever were discovered in Norfolk, and a machinist died from the disease on July 8. By August, several people were dying per day, and a third of the city's population had fled in the hopes of escaping the epidemic. No one understood how the disease was transmitted. With both Norfolk and Portsmouth being infected, New York banned all traffic from those sites. Neighboring cities also banned residents from Norfolk. The epidemic spread through the city via mosquitoes and poor sanitation, affecting every family and causing widespread panic. The number of infected reached 5,000 in September, and by the second week, 1,500 had died in Norfolk and Portsmouth. As the weather cooled, the outbreak began to wane, leaving a final tally of about 3,200 dead. It took the city some time to recover.

In early 1861, Norfolk voters instructed their delegate to vote for secession. Virginia voted to secede from the Union. In the spring of 1862, the Battle of Hampton Roads took place off the northwest shore of the city's Sewell's Point Peninsula, marking the first fight between two ironclads, the USS Monitor and the CSS Virginia. The battle ended in a stalemate, but changed the course of naval warfare; from then on, warships were fortified with metal.

In May 1862, Norfolk Mayor William Lamb surrendered the city to Union General John E. Wool and his forces. They held the city under martial law for the duration of the Civil War. Thousands of slaves from the region escaped to Union lines to gain freedom; they quickly set up schools in Norfolk to start learning how to read and write, years before the end of the war.

20th century to present
1907 brought both the Virginian Railway and the Jamestown Exposition to Sewell's Point. The large Naval Review at the Exposition demonstrated the peninsula's favorable location and laid the groundwork for the world's largest naval base. Southern Democrats in Congress gained its location here. Commemorating the tricentennial anniversary of the founding of Jamestown, the exposition featured many prominent officials, including President Theodore Roosevelt, members of Congress, and diplomats from twenty-one countries. By 1917, as the US prepared to enter World War I, the Naval Air Station Hampton Roads had been constructed on the former exposition grounds.

In the first half of the twentieth century, the city of Norfolk expanded its borders through annexation. In 1906, the city annexed the incorporated town of Berkley, making the city cross the Elizabeth River. In 1923, the city expanded to include Sewell's Point, Willoughby Spit, the town of Campostella, and the Ocean View area. The city included the Navy Base and miles of beach property fronting on Hampton Roads and the Chesapeake Bay. After a smaller annexation in 1959, and a 1988 land swap with Virginia Beach, the city assumed its current boundaries.

The establishment of the Interstate Highway System following World War II brought new highways to the region. A series of bridges and tunnels, constructed during fifteen years, linked Norfolk with the Peninsula, Portsmouth, and Virginia Beach. In 1952, the Downtown Tunnel opened to connect Norfolk with the city of Portsmouth. The highways also stimulated the development of new housing suburbs, leading to the population spreading out. Additional bridges and tunnels included the Hampton Roads Bridge-Tunnel in 1957, the Midtown Tunnel in 1962, and the Virginia Beach-Norfolk Expressway (Interstate 264 and State Route 44) in 1967. In 1991, the new Downtown Tunnel/Berkley Bridge complex opened a new system of multiple lanes of highway and interchanges connecting Downtown Norfolk and Interstate 464 with the Downtown Tunnel tubes.

In 1954 the Supreme Court ruled in Brown v. Board of Education that segregated public schools were unconstitutional, as the public system was supported by all taxpayers. It ordered integration, but Virginia pursued a policy of "massive resistance". (At this time, most black citizens were still disfranchised under the state's turn-of-the-century constitution and discriminatory practices related to voter registration and elections.) The Virginia General Assembly prohibited state funding for integrated public schools.

In 1958, United States district courts in Virginia ordered schools to open for the first time on a racially integrated basis. In response, Governor J. Lindsay Almond ordered the schools closed. The Virginia Supreme Court of Appeals declared the state law to be in conflict with the state constitution and ordered all public schools to be funded, whether integrated or not. About ten days later, Almond capitulated and asked the General Assembly to rescind several "massive resistance" laws. In September 1959, seventeen black children entered six previously segregated Norfolk public schools. Virginian-Pilot editor Lenoir Chambers editorialized against massive resistance and earned the Pulitzer Prize for Editorial Writing.

With new suburban developments beckoning, many white middle-class residents moved out of the city along new highway routes, and Norfolk's population declined, a pattern repeated in numerous cities during the postwar era independently of segregation issues. In the late-1960s and early-1970s, the advent of newer suburban shopping destinations along with freeways spelled demise for the fortunes of downtown's Granby Street commercial corridor, located just a few blocks inland from the waterfront. The opening of malls and large shopping centers drew off retail business from Granby Street.

People for the Ethical Treatment of Animals (PETA) has been based in Norfolk since 1996.

Norfolk's city leaders began a long push to revive its urban core. While Granby Street underwent decline, Norfolk city leaders focused on the waterfront and its collection of decaying piers and warehouses. Many obsolete shipping and warehousing facilities were demolished. In their place, planners created a new boulevard, Waterside Drive, along which many of the high-rise buildings in Norfolk's skyline have been erected. In 1983, the city and The Rouse Company developed the Waterside festival marketplace to attract people back to the waterfront and catalyze further downtown redevelopment. Waterside was redeveloped in 2017. Additionally the waterfront area hosts the Nauticus maritime museum and the USS Wisconsin. Other facilities opened in the ensuing years, including the Harbor Park baseball stadium, home of the Norfolk Tides Triple-A minor league baseball team. In 1995, the park was named the finest facility in minor league baseball by Baseball America. Norfolk's efforts to revitalize its downtown have attracted acclaim from economic development and urban planning circles throughout the country. Downtown's rising fortunes helped to expand the city's revenues and allowed the city to direct attention to other neighborhoods.

Geography

The city is located at the southeastern corner of Virginia at the junction of the Elizabeth River and the Chesapeake Bay. The Hampton Roads Metropolitan Statistical Area (officially known as the Virginia Beach-Norfolk-Newport News, VA-NC MSA) is the 37th largest in the United States, with an estimated population of 1,716,624 in 2014. The area includes the Virginia cities of Norfolk, Virginia Beach, Chesapeake, Hampton, Newport News, Poquoson, Portsmouth, Suffolk, Williamsburg, and the counties of Gloucester, Isle of Wight, James City, Mathews, and York, as well as the North Carolina counties of Currituck and Gates. The city of Norfolk is recognized as the central business district, while the Virginia Beach oceanside resort district and Williamsburg are primarily centers of tourism. Virginia Beach is the most populated city within the MSA though it functions more as a suburb. Additionally, Norfolk is part of the Virginia Beach-Norfolk, VA-NC Combined Statistical Area, which includes the Virginia Beach-Norfolk-Newport News, VA-NC MSA, the Elizabeth City, North Carolina Micropolitan Statistical Area, and the Kill Devil Hills, NC Micropolitan Statistical Area. The CSA is the 32nd largest in the nation with an estimated population in 2013 of 1,810,266.

In addition to extensive riverfront property, Norfolk has miles of bayfront resort property and beaches in the Willoughby Spit and Ocean View communities.

Sea level rise and subsidence

Being low-lying and largely surrounded by water, Norfolk is particularly vulnerable to rising sea levels caused by climate change. In addition, the land on which it is built is slowly subsiding. Some areas already flood regularly at high tide, and the city commissioned a study in 2012 to investigate how to address the issue in the future: it reported the cost of dealing with a sea-level rise of one foot would be around $1,000,000,000. Since then, scientists at the Virginia Institute of Marine Science in 2013 have estimated that if current trends hold, the sea in Norfolk will rise by 5 and 1/2 feet or more by the end of this century.

Cityscape

When Norfolk was first settled, homes were made of wood and frame construction, similar to most medieval English-style homes. These homes had wide chimneys and thatch roofs. Some decades after the town was first laid out in 1682, the Georgian architectural style, which was popular in the South at the time, was used. Brick was considered more substantial construction; patterns were made by brick laid and Flemish bond. This style evolved to include projecting center pavilions, Palladian windows, balustraded roof decks, and two-story porticoes. By 1740, homes, warehouses, stores, workshops, and taverns began to dot Norfolk's streets.

Norfolk was burned down during the Revolutionary War. After the Revolution, Norfolk was rebuilt in the Federal style, based on Roman ideals. Federal-style homes kept Georgian symmetry, though they had more refined decorations to look like New World homes. Federal homes had features such as narrow sidelights with an embracing fanlight around the doorway, giant porticoes, gable or flat roofs, and projecting bays on exterior walls. Rooms were oval, elliptical or octagonal. Few of these federal rowhouses remain standing today. A majority of buildings were made of wood and had a simple construction.

In the early nineteenth century, Neoclassical architectural elements began to appear in the federal style row homes, such as ionic columns in the porticoes and classic motifs over doorways and windows. Many Federal-style row houses were modernized by placing a Greek-style porch at the front. Greek and Roman elements were integrated into public buildings such as the old City Hall, the old Norfolk Academy, and the Customs House.

Greek-style homes gave way to Gothic Revival in the 1830s, which emphasized pointed arches, steep gable roofs, towers and tracer-lead windows. The Freemason Baptist Church and St. Mary's Catholic Church are examples of Gothic Revival. Italianate elements emerged in the 1840s including cupolas, verandas, ornamental brickwork, or corner quoins. Norfolk still had simple wooden structures among its more ornate buildings.

High-rise buildings were first built in the late nineteenth century when structures such as the current Commodore Maury Hotel and the Royster Building were constructed to form the initial Norfolk skyline. Past styles were revived during the early years of the twentieth century. Bungalows and apartment buildings became popular for those living in the city.

As the Great Depression wore on, Art Deco emerged as a popular building style, as evidenced by the Post Office building downtown. Art Deco consisted of streamlined concrete faced appearance with smooth stone or metal, with terracotta, and trimming consisting of glass and colored tiles.

Neighborhoods

Norfolk has a variety of historic neighborhoods, notably Freemason and West Freemason. Some neighborhoods, such as Berkley, were formerly cities and towns. Others, including Willoughby Spit and Ocean View, have a long history tied to the Chesapeake Bay. The city's revitalization in recent decades has transformed neighborhoods such as Downtown, Ghent and Fairmount Park. Popular residential neighborhoods include Ghent, Colonial Place, Larchmont, North Shore, Edgewater, and Lafayette Shores.

Climate
Narrative below is based on climate data from the 1991-2020 period. Norfolk has a humid subtropical climate and its USDA Hardiness Zone is 8a. Spring arrives in March with mild days and cool nights, and by late May, the temperature has warmed up considerably to herald warm summer days. Summers are consistently warm and humid, but the nearby Atlantic Ocean often exercises a slight cooling effect on daytime high temperatures, but a slight warming effect on nighttime low temperatures (compared to areas farther inland). On average, July and August are the wettest months, due to frequent summer thunderstorm activity. In August and September, rainfall remains high, due to rising frequency of tropical activity (hurricanes and tropical storms), which can bring high winds and heavy rains. These usually brush Norfolk and only occasionally make landfalls in the area; the highest-risk period is mid-August to the end of September. Fall is marked by mild to warm days and cooler nights. Winter is usually mild in Norfolk, with average winter days featuring lows near or slightly above freezing and highs in the upper-40s to mid-50s (8 to 13 °C).

Demographics

2020 census

Note: the US Census treats Hispanic/Latino as an ethnic category. This table excludes Latinos from the racial categories and assigns them to a separate category. Hispanics/Latinos can be of any race.

2010 Census

As of the census of 2010, there were 242,803 people, 86,210 households, and 51,898 families residing in the city. The population density was 4,362.8 people per square mile (1,684.4/km2). There were 94,416 housing units at an average density of 1,757.3 per square mile (678.5/km2). The racial makeup of the city was 47.1% White, 43.1% African American, 0.5% Native American, 3.3% Asian, 0.2% Pacific Islander, 2.2% from other races, and 3.6% from two or more races. Hispanics or Latinos of any race were 6.6% of the population. Non-Hispanic Whites were 44.3% of the population in 2010, down from 68.5% in 1970.

There were 86,210 households, out of which 30.3% had children under the age of 18 living with them, 36.9% were married couples living together, 18.8% had a female householder with no husband present, and 39.8% were non-families. 30.2% of all households were made up of individuals, and 9.6% had someone living alone who was 65 years of age or older. The average household size was 2.45 and the average family size was 3.07.

The age distribution was 24.0% under the age of 18, 18.2% from 18 to 24, 29.9% from 25 to 44, 16.9% from 45 to 64, and 10.9% who were 65 years of age or older. The median age was 30 years. For every 100 females, there were 104.6 males. For every 100 females age 18 and over, there were 104.8 males. This large gender imbalance is due to the military presence in the city, most notably Naval Station Norfolk.

The median income for a household in the city was $31,815, and the median income for a family was $36,891. Males had a median income of $25,848 versus $21,907 for females. The per capita income for the city was $17,372. About 15.5% of families and 19.4% of the population were below the poverty line, including 27.9% of those under age 18 and 13.2% of those ages 65 or over.

For the year of 2007, Norfolk had a total crime index of 514.7 per 100,000 residents. This was above the national average of 320.9 that year. For 2007, the city experienced 48 homicides, for a murder rate of 21.1 per 100,000 residents. Total crime had decreased when compared to the year 2000, which the city had a total crime index of 546.3. The highest murder rate Norfolk has experienced for the 21st century was in 2005 when its rate was 24.5 per 100,000 residents. For the year 2007 per 100,000, Norfolk experienced 21.1 murders, 42.6 rapes, 399.3 robberies, 381.3 assaults, 743.3 burglaries, and 450.6 automobile thefts. According to the Congressional Quarterly Press '2008 City Crime Rankings: Crime in Metropolitan America, Norfolk, Virginia, ranked as the 87th most dangerous city larger than 75,000 inhabitants.

Economy

Since Norfolk serves as the commercial and cultural center for the unusual geographical region of Hampton Roads (and in its political structure of independent cities), it can be difficult to separate the economic characteristics of Norfolk from that of the region as a whole.

The waterways which almost completely surround the Hampton Roads region play an important part in the local economy. As a strategic location at the mouth of the Chesapeake Bay, its protected deep-water channels serve as a major trade artery for the import and export of goods from across the Mid-Atlantic, Mid-West, and internationally.

In addition to commercial activities, Hampton Roads is a major military center, particularly for the United States Navy, and Norfolk serves as the home for Naval Station Norfolk, the world's largest naval installation. Located on Sewell's Point Peninsula, in the northwest corner of the city, the station is the headquarters of the United States Fleet Forces Command (formerly known as the Atlantic Fleet), which compromises over 62,000 active duty personnel, 75 ships, and 132 aircraft. The base also serves as the headquarters to NATO's Allied Command Transformation.

The region also plays an important role in defense contracting, with particular emphasis in the shipbuilding and ship repair businesses for the city of Norfolk. Major private shipyards located in Norfolk or the Hampton Roads area include: Huntington Ingalls Industries (formerly Northrop Grumman Newport News) in Newport News, BAE Systems Norfolk Ship Repair, General Dynamics NASSCO Norfolk, and Colonna's Shipyard Inc., while the US Navy's Norfolk Naval Shipyard is just across the Downtown Tunnel in Portsmouth. Most contracts fulfilled by these shipyards are issued by the Navy, though some private commercial repair also takes place. Over 35% of Gross Regional Product (which includes the entire Norfolk-Newport News-Virginia Beach MSA), is attributable to defense spending, and that 75% of all regional growth since 2001 is attributable to increases in defense spending.

After the military, the second largest and most important industry for Hampton Roads and Norfolk based on economic impact are the region's cargo ports. Headquartered in Norfolk, the Virginia Port Authority (VPA) is a Commonwealth of Virginia owned-entity that, in turn, owns and operates three major port facilities in Hampton Roads for break-bulk and container type cargo. In Norfolk, Norfolk International Terminals (NIT) represents one of those three facilities and is home to the world's largest and fastest container cranes. Together, the three terminals of the VPA handled a total of over 2 million TEUs and 475,000 tons of breakbulk cargo in 2006, making it the second busiest port on the east coast of North America by total cargo volume after the Port of New York and New Jersey.

In addition to NIT, Norfolk is home to Lambert's Point Docks, the largest coal trans-shipment point in the Northern Hemisphere, with an annual throughput of approximately 48,000,000 tons. Bituminous coal is primarily sourced from the Appalachian mountains in western Virginia, West Virginia, and Kentucky. The coal is loaded onto trains and sent to the port where it is unloaded onto large breakbulk cargo ships and destined for New England, Europe, and Asia.

Between 1925 and 2007, Ford Motor Company operated Norfolk Assembly, a manufacturing plant located on the Elizabeth River that had produced the Model-T, sedans and station wagons before building F-150 pick-up trucks. Before it closed, the plant employed more than 2,600 people at the  facility.

Most major shipping lines have a permanent presence in the region with some combination of sales, distribution, and/or logistical offices, many of which are located in Norfolk. In addition, many of the largest international shipping companies have chosen Norfolk as their North American headquarters. These companies are either located at the Norfolk World Trade Center building or have constructed buildings in the Lake Wright Executive Center office park. The French firm CMA CGM, the Israeli firm Zim Integrated Shipping Services, and Maersk Line Limited, a subsidiary of the world's largest shipping line, A. P. Moller-Maersk Group, have their North American headquarters in Norfolk. Major companies headquartered in Norfolk include Norfolk Southern, Landmark Communications, Dominion Enterprises, FHC Health Systems (parent company of ValueOptions), Portfolio Recovery Associates, and BlackHawk Products Group.

Though Virginia Beach and Williamsburg have traditionally been the centers of tourism for the region, the rebirth of downtown Norfolk and the construction of a cruise ship pier at the foot of Nauticus in downtown has driven tourism to become an increasingly important part of the city's economy. The number of cruise ship passengers who visited Norfolk increased from 50,000 in 2003, to 107,000 in 2004 and 2005. Also in April 2007, the city completed construction on a $36 million state-of-the-art cruise ship terminal alongside the pier. Partly due to this construction, passenger counts dropped to 70,000 in 2006, but is expected to rebound to 90,000 in 2007, and higher in later years. Unlike most cruise ship terminals which are located in industrial areas, the downtown location of Norfolk's terminal has received favorable reviews from both tourists and the cruise lines who enjoy its proximity to the city's hotels, restaurants, shopping, and cultural amenities.

Hampton Roads is home to four Fortune 500 companies. Representing the food industry, transportation, retail and shipbuilding, these four companies are located in Smithfield, Norfolk, Chesapeake and Newport News.

2013 Fortune 500 Corporations
213 Smithfield Foods
247 Norfolk Southern
346 Dollar Tree
380 Huntington Ingalls Industries

26% of the 130,000 people working in Norfolk live in the city, while 74% commute in. 37% of those come from Virginia Beach and 20% come from Chesapeake. An additional 51,575 people commute outside for work, with 35% going to Virginia Beach and 20% going to Chesapeake.

Top employers

According to a report published by the Virginia Employment Commission, below are the top employers in Norfolk:

Arts and culture

Norfolk is the cultural heart of the Hampton Roads region. In addition to its museums, Norfolk is the principal home for several major performing arts organizations. The city hosts numerous annual festivals and parades, many in Town Point Park or elsewhere in downtown.

Museums and Galleries 

The nationally acclaimed Chrysler Museum of Art, the area's most comprehensive art museum, has its campus at the intersection of the Ghent district, the Freemason neighborhood, and the NEON district. Since opening in 1933, the museum's main building has been expanded six times to allow for larger glass galleries, generous space for Impressionist and Baroque works, and more. Major improvements were completed in 2014, and today the museum features more than 50 galleries, a restaurant, and catering facilities, as well as galleries for traveling exhibits. Of particular note are the American neoclassical marble sculptures, the extensive glass collection, and the Glass Studio, which has live demonstrations daily.

The Chrysler Museum of Art also administers the 1792 Moses Myers House Museum in the Freemason District, next to MacArthur Mall. This museum interprets Norfolk's history and the lives and legacy of Norfolk's first Jewish family. Seventy percent of the objects in the home are original to the Myers in the early nineteenth century. The museum offers weekend tours and special monthly programming. In October 2022, the council of City of Norfolk, which owns the property, voted to proceed with the possibility of selling it, conjecturing the entirety of the property—the main house, the attached dwelling of the Myers’ enslaved servants, and the historic garden—could be sold as part of a package to developers, perhaps to operate as a bed and breakfast. Multiple entities, including the Norfolk Historical Society, have expressed distress and outrage.

The Hermitage Foundation Museum, located in an early 20th-century Tudor-style home on a  estate fronting the Lafayette River, is found in the Lochaven neighborhood near the northern terminus of the Elizabeth River Trail that connects many of the city's sites of cultural interest. The Hermitage features an eclectic collection of Asian and Western art, including Chinese bronze and ceramics, Persian rugs, and ivory carvings, as well as changing exhibitions, arts classes, and special events. The Hermitage Foundation Museum is the only Smithsonian Affiliate in the Hampton Roads region.

Downtown Norfolk has several other museums of national significance.Nauticus, the National Maritime Center, opened on the downtown waterfront in 1994. It features hands-on exhibits, interactive theaters, aquaria, digital high-definition films and an extensive variety of educational programs. Since 2000, Nauticus has been home to the battleship USS Wisconsin, the last battleship to be built in the United States. It served briefly in World War II and later in the Korean and Gulf Wars. Wisconsin Square is nearby.

The MacArthur Memorial, located in the nineteenth-century Norfolk courthouse and city hall in downtown, contains the tombs of General Douglas MacArthur and his wife, a museum and a vast research library, personal belongings (including his famous corncob pipe) and a short film that chronicles his life.

Speciality museums include the Hunter House Victorian Museum in the Freemason neighborhood and the Norfolk Southern Museum in downtown.

Performing Arts 

Norfolk has a variety of performing groups with regular seasons and which also make appearances in the city's annual festivals. The Virginia Symphony Orchestra, founded in 1920, has been leader in the regional arts scene. Directed by JoAnn Falletta from 1991 until 2020, the orchestra's music director is now Erik Jacobsen. Most Norfolk performances take place at Chrysler Hall in the Scope complex downtown. The orchestra provides musicians for many other performing arts organizations in the area.

The Virginia Stage Company, founded in 1968, is one of the country's leading regional theaters and produces a full season of plays in the Wells Theatre downtown. The company shares facilities with the Governor's School for the Arts.'

The Virginia Opera was founded in Norfolk in 1974. Its artistic director since its inception has been Peter Mark, who conducted his 100th opera production for the VOA in 2008. Though performances are staged statewide, the company's principal venue is the Harrison Opera House in the Ghent district.

Large-scale concerts are held at either the Norfolk Scope arena or the Ted Constant Convocation Center at ODU, while The Norva provides a more intimate atmosphere for smaller groups. Other Norfolk cultural venues include the Attucks Theatre, the Jeanne and George Roper Performing Arts Center (formerly the Loew's State Theater) and the Naro Expanded Cinema.

Festivals 

A range of arts and cultural festivals take place annually in Norfolk. The Virginia Arts Festival, founded in 1997, is based in Norfolk and has events throughout the region, drawing in arts from around the world and featuring local talent. One of the key events of the festival is the Virginia International Tattoo. The Norfolk NATO Festival, formerly the International Azela Festival, has taken place each spring since 1951 and is the longest continually running festival in the Hampton Roads Region. The Norfolk NATO Festival highlights Norfolk's role as the North American Headquarters of NATO and fosters cultural exchange and appreciation of NATO allies. The Stockley Gardens Art Festival, which takes place in parks the historic Ghent neighborhood, occurs twice yearly, in May and October. The festival draws vendors from well beyond the region and attracts upwards of 20,000 visitors. The St. Patrick's Day annual parade in the city's Ocean View neighborhood, on the northern edge of the city, celebrates Ocean View's rich Irish heritage.

Harborfest, the region's largest annual festival, celebrated its thirtieth anniversary in 2006. It is held during the first weekend of June in Town Point Park  and celebrates the region's proximity and attachment to the water. The Parade of Sails (numerous tall sailing ships from around the world form in line and sail past downtown before docking at the marina), music concerts, regional food, and a large fireworks display highlight this three-day festival. Bayou Boogaloo and Cajun Food Festival, a celebration of the Cajun people and culture, had small beginnings. This three-day festival during the third week of June has become one of the largest in the region and, in addition to serving up Cajun cuisine, also features Cajun music. Norfolk's Fourth of July celebration of American independence contains a spectacular fireworks display and a special Navy reenlistment ceremony. The Norfolk Jazz Festival, though smaller by comparison to some of the big city jazz festivals, still manages to attract the country's top jazz performers. It is held in August. The Town Point Virginia Wine Festival has become a showcase for Virginia-produced wines and has enjoyed increasing success over the years. Virginia's burgeoning wine industry has become noted both within the United States and on an international level. The festival has grown with the industry. Wines can be sampled and then purchased by the bottle and/or case directly from the winery kiosks. This event takes place during the third weekend of October. There is also a Spring Wine Festival held during the second weekend of May.

Public Art 

The city is known for its "," a public art program launched in 2002 to place mermaid statues all over the city. Tourists can take a walking tour of downtown and locate 17 mermaids while others can be found further afield.

The NEON district has dozens of murals, many of which are supported through the City of Norfolk's Public Arts Commission.

Role in Revitalization 

The revitalization of downtown Norfolk has helped to improve the Hampton Roads cultural scene. Many of Norfolk's attractions are now connected by the 10.5-mile long Elizabeth River Trail, a pedestrian and bike trail that winds along the city's waterfront.  The trail's first segment of opened in 2003 on land donated by Norfolk Southern. A large number of clubs, representing a wide range of music interests and sophistication now line the lower Granby Street area. The nearby Waterside Festival Marketplace has also continued to be successful as a nightclub and bar venue. Norfolk celebrates the rich ethnic diversity of its population with sights, sounds, attractions and special events that pay tribute to the city's long multicultural heritage.

Parks and recreation

Town Point Park in downtown plays host to a wide variety of annual events from early spring through late fall. 

Norfolk has a variety of parks and open spaces in its city parks system. The city maintains three beaches on its north shore in the Ocean View area. Five additional parks contain picnic facilities and playgrounds for children. The city also has some community pools open to city residents.

The Norfolk Botanical Garden, opened in 1939, is a  botanical garden and arboretum located near the Norfolk International Airport. It is open year-round.

The Virginia Zoological Park, opened in 1900, is a  zoo with hundreds of animals on display, including the critically endangered Siberian tiger and threatened white rhino.

Sports

Norfolk serves as home to the two highest level professional franchises in the state of Virginia — the Norfolk Tides play baseball in the International League, and the Norfolk Admirals play ice hockey in the ECHL.

Norfolk has two universities with Division I sports teams — the Old Dominion Monarchs and the Norfolk State University Spartans — which provide many sports including football, basketball, and baseball.

From 1970 to 1976, Norfolk served as the home court (along with Hampton, Richmond, and Roanoke) for the Virginia Squires regional professional basketball franchise of the now-defunct American Basketball Association (ABA). From 1970 to 1971, the Squires played their Norfolk home games at the Old Dominion University Fieldhouse. In November 1971, the Squires played their Norfolk home games at the new Norfolk Scope arena, until the team and the ABA league folded in May 1976.

In 1971, Norfolk built an entertainment and sports complex, featuring Chrysler Hall and the 13,800-seat Norfolk Scope indoor arena, located in the northern section of downtown. Norfolk Scope has served as a venue for major events including the American Basketball Association All-Star Game in 1974, and the first and second NCAA Women's Division I Basketball Championships (also known as the Women's Final Four) in 1982 and 1983.

Norfolk is also home to the Norfolk Blues Rugby Football Club.

National Wrestling Alliance, Jim Crockett Promotions, World Championship Wrestling, and World Wrestling Entertainment have all presented wrestling shows at Norfolk Arena and the Scope from the 1960s to today, with many of these being Pay Per View events. Six-time World Heavyweight Wrestling Champion Lou Thesz lived in Norfolk and opened a wrestling school, Virginia Wrestling Academy, downtown in 1988.

Government

Norfolk is an independent city with services that both counties and cities in Virginia provide, such as a sheriff, social services, and a court system. Norfolk operates under a council-manager form of government.

Norfolk city government consists of a city council with representatives from seven districts serving in a legislative and oversight capacity, as well as a popularly elected, at-large mayor. The city manager serves as head of the executive branch and supervises all city departments and executing policies adopted by the council. Citizens in each of the five wards elect one council representative each to serve a four-year term. There are two additional council members elected from two citywide "superwards." The city council meets at City Hall weekly and, as of May 2016, consists of: Mayor Kenneth Cooper Alexander; Mamie Johnson, Ward 3; Angelia Williams, Superward 7; Paul R. Riddick, Ward 4; Vice Mayor Dr. Theresa W. Whibley, Ward 2; Martin Thomas, Ward 1; Andria McClellan, Superward 6; Thomas R. Smigiel Jr. Ward 5.

 Samuel Boush, 1736 (died in office)
 George Newton, 1736 etc.
 John Hutchings, 1737 etc.
 John Taylor, 1739 etc.
 Samuel Smith
 Josiah Smith, 1741 etc.
 John Phripp, 1744 etc.
 Edward Pugh
 Thomas Newton
 John Tucker, 1748 etc.
 Robert Tucker, 1749 etc.
 Durham Hall
 Wilson Newton, 1751 etc.
 Christopher Perkins, 1752 etc.
 George Abyvon, 1754 etc.
 Richard Kelsick
 John Phripp
 Paul Loyall, 1762 etc.
 Archibald Campbell
 Lewis Hansford
 Maximilian Calvert, 1765 etc.
 James Taylor, 1766 etc.
 Cornelius Calvert, 1768 etc.
 Charles Thomas, 1770 etc.
 Thomas Newton, Jr., 1780 etc.
 George Kelly, 1783 and 1788
 Robert Taylor, 1784
 Cary H. Hansford
 Benjamin Pollard, 1787
 Robert Taylor, 1789 and 1793
 John Boush
 Cary H. Hansford
 Thomas Newton, Jr., 1792 etc.
 John Ramsay
 Seth Foster
 Samuel Moseley
 George Loyall
 Baylor Hill
 John K. Read
 Seth Foster
 John Cowper
 William Vaughan
 Thomas H. Parker
 Miles King, Sr., 1804 etc.
 Luke Wheeler, 1805
 Thomas H. Parker, 1806
 Richard E. Lee, 1807
 John E. Holt, 1808–1832, various nonsequential years
 William Boswell Lamb, 1810, 1812, 1814, 1816, and 1823
 John Tabb, 1818 etc.
 Wright Southgate, 1819 etc.
 George W. Camp
 William A. Armistead
 Isaac Talbot
 Daniel C. Barraud
 George T. Kennon
 Thomas Williamson
 Giles B. Cook
 Miles King, Jr., 1832
 W.D. Delaney, 1843
 Simon S. Stubbs, 1851 etc.
 Hunter Woodis, 1853, 1855 (died in office)
 Ezra T. Summers
 Finlay F. Ferguson
 William Wilson Lamb, 1858-1863
 William H. Brooks, 1863
 James L. Belote, 1864
 Thomas C. Tabb
 John R. Ludlow, 1866 etc.
 Francis DeCordy
 John B. Whitehead, 1870 etc.
 John S. Tucker, 1876-1880
 William Lamb, 1880-1886
 Barton Myers, 1886-1888
 Richard G. Banks, 1888-1890
 E.M. Henry
 Frank Morris
 S. Marx
 A.B. Cooke
 Charles W. Pettit
 Wyndham R. Mayo, 1896-1898 and 1912-1918
 C. Brooks Johnston, 1898-1901
 Nathaniel Beaman, 1901
 James Gregory Riddick, 1901-1912
 Albert L. Roper, 1918-1924
 S. Heth Tyler, 1924-1932
 E. Jeff Robertson, 1932
 Phillip H. Mason, 1932-1933
 S.L. Slover, 1933
 W. R. L. Taylor, 1934-1938
 John A. Gurkin, 1938-1940
 Joseph D. Wood, 1940-1944
 James W. Reed, 1944-1946
 R.D. Cooke, 1946-1949
 Pretlow Darden, 1949-1950
 W. Fred Duckworth, 1950-1962
  Roy Martin, 1962-1974
 Irvine B. Hill, 1974-1976
 Vincent J. Thomas, 1976-1984
 Joseph A. Leafe, 1984-1992
 Mason Andrews, 1992-1994
 Paul D. Fraim, 1994-2016
 Kenneth Cooper Alexander, 2016-

The City government has an infrastructure to create close working relationships with its citizens. Norfolk's city government provides services for neighborhoods, including service centers and civic leagues that interact directly with members of City Council. Such services include preserving area histories, home rehabilitation centers, outreach programs, and a university that trains citizens in neighborhood clean-up, event planning, neighborhood leadership, and financial planning. Norfolk's police department also provides support for neighborhood watch programs including a citizens' training academy, security design, a police athletic program for youth, and business watch programs.

Norfolk also has a federal courthouse for the United States District Court for the Eastern District of Virginia. The Walter E. Hoffman U.S. Courthouse in Norfolk has four judges, four magistrate judges, and two bankruptcy judges. Additionally, Norfolk has its own general district and circuit courts, which convene downtown. It is considered a Democratic stronghold.

Education

Norfolk City Public Schools, the public school system, comprises five high schools, eight middle schools, 34 elementary schools, and nine special-purpose/preschools. In 2005, Norfolk Public Schools won the $1 million Broad Prize for Urban Education for having demonstrated, "the greatest overall performance and improvement in student achievement while reducing achievement gaps for poor and minority students". The city had previously been nominated in 2003 and 2004. There are also a number of private schools located in the city, the oldest of which, Norfolk Academy, was founded in 1728. Religious schools located in the city include St. Pius X Catholic School, Alliance Christian School, Christ the King School, Norfolk Christian Schools and Trinity Lutheran School. The city also hosts the Governor's School for the Arts which holds performances and classes at the Wells Theatre.

Norfolk is home to three public universities and one private. It also hosts a community college campus in downtown. Old Dominion University, founded as the Norfolk Division of the College of William & Mary in 1930, became an independent institution in 1962 and now offers degrees in 68 undergraduate and 95 (60 masters/35 doctoral) graduate degree programs. Eastern Virginia Medical School, founded as a community medical school by the surrounding jurisdictions in 1973, is noted for its research into reproductive medicine and is located in the region's major medical complex in the Ghent district. Norfolk State University founded in 1935 is the second largest HBCU in Virginia. Norfolk State offers degrees in a wide variety of liberal arts, Social Work, Nursing, and Engineering. Virginia State University being the first largest HBCU in Virginia, which was founded in 1882. Virginia Wesleyan College is a small private liberal arts college and shares its eastern border with the neighboring city of Virginia Beach. Tidewater Community College offers two-year degrees and specialized training programs and is located in downtown. Additionally, several for-profit schools operate in the city.

Norfolk Public Library

Norfolk Public Library, Virginia's first public library, consists of one main library, two anchor libraries, nine branch libraries and a bookmobile. The library also has a local history and genealogy room and contains government documents dating back to the 19th century. The libraries offer services such as computer classes, book reviews, tax forms, and online book clubs.

The Slover Library, centrally located in the heart of downtown Norfolk, holds over 133,000 books and resources available for borrowing, hosts numerous classes and community events, houses the history Sargeant Memorial Collection, and offers patrons the use of cutting-edge technologies and studio spaces. Technology areas include a Sound Studio, Design Studio, Production Studio, YOUmedia lab, Maker Studio (Selden Market), and Computer Room and Training Lab.

Media
Norfolk's daily newspaper is The Virginian-Pilot. Its alternative papers include the (now defunct) Port Folio Weekly, the New Journal and Guide, and the online AltDaily.com. Inside Business serves the regional business community with local business news.

Norfolk Post was published 13 January 1921 to 1 February 1924.

Local universities publish their own newspapers: Old Dominion University's Mace and Crown, Norfolk State University's The Spartan Echo, and Virginia Wesleyan College's Marlin Chronicles.

Coastal Virginia Magazine is a bi-monthly regional magazine for Norfolk and the Hampton Roads area.

Hampton Roads Times is an online magazine for Norfolk and the Hampton Roads area.

Norfolk is served by a variety of radio stations on the AM and FM dials, with towers located around the Hampton Roads area. These cater to many different interests, including news, talk radio, and sports, as well as an eclectic mix of musical interests.

Norfolk is served by several television stations. The Hampton Roads designated market area (DMA) is the 42nd largest in the U.S. with 712,790 homes (0.64% of the total U.S.). Major network television affiliates include:

Norfolk residents also can receive independent stations, such as WSKY broadcasting on channel 4 from the Outer Banks of North Carolina and WGBS-LD broadcasting on channel 11 from Hampton. Norfolk is served by Cox Cable which provides LNC 5, a local 24-hour cable news television network. DirecTV and Dish Network are also very popular as an alternative to cable television in Norfolk.

Several major motion pictures have been filmed in and around Norfolk, including Rollercoaster (filmed at the former Ocean View Amusement Park), Navy Seals, and Mission: Impossible III (partially filmed at the Chesapeake Bay Bridge Tunnel).

Infrastructure

Transportation

The city has a long history as a strategic military and transportation point, where many railroad lines started. Norfolk was the terminus of the Atlantic and Danville Railway in 1890. It is linked to its neighbors by an extensive network of interstate highways, bridges, tunnels, and three bridge-tunnel complexes, which are the only bridge-tunnels in the United States. The city was the corporate headquarters of Norfolk Southern Railway, one of North America's principal Class I railroads, before the company relocated their headquarters to Atlanta, Georgia.

Norfolk is linked with its neighbors through an extensive network of arterial and Interstate highways, bridges, tunnels, and bridge-tunnel complexes. The major east–west routes are Interstate 64, U.S. Route 58 (Virginia Beach Boulevard) and U.S. Route 60 (Ocean View Avenue). The major north–south routes are U.S. Route 13 and U.S. Route 460, also known as Granby Street. Other main roadways in Norfolk include Newtown Road, Waterside Drive, Tidewater Drive, and Military Highway. The Hampton Roads Beltway (I-64, I-264, I-464, and I-664) makes a loop around Norfolk.

Norfolk is primarily served by the Norfolk International Airport , now the region's major commercial airport. The airport is located near the Chesapeake Bay, along with the city limits straddling neighboring Virginia Beach. Seven airlines provide nonstop services to twenty five destinations. ORF had 3,703,664 passengers take off or land at its facility and 68,778,934 pounds of cargo were processed through its facilities. Newport News/Williamsburg International Airport also provides commercial air service for the Hampton Roads area. NNWIA is also the only airport in the region with direct international flights, as of February 2013. The Chesapeake Regional Airport provides general aviation services and is located  outside the city limits.

Norfolk is served by Amtrak's Northeast Regional service through the Norfolk station, located in downtown Norfolk adjacent to Harbor Park stadium. The line runs west along Norfolk Southern trackage, paralleling the US Route 460 corridor to Petersburg, thence on to Richmond and beyond.
A high-speed rail connection at Richmond to both the Northeast Corridor and the Southeast High-Speed Rail Corridor are also under study.

Greyhound Lines provides service from a central bus terminal in downtown Norfolk.

In April 2007, construction of the new $36 million Half Moone Cruise Terminal was completed downtown adjacent to the Nauticus Museum, providing a state-of-the-art permanent structure for various cruise lines and passengers wishing to embark from Norfolk. Previously, makeshift structures were used to embark/disembark passengers, supplies, and crew.

The Intracoastal Waterway passes through Norfolk. Norfolk also has extensive frontage and port facilities on the navigable portions of the Western and Southern Branches of the Elizabeth River.

Light rail, bus, ferry and paratransit services are provided by Hampton Roads Transit (HRT), the regional public transport system headquartered in Hampton. HRT buses operate throughout Norfolk and South Hampton Roads and onto the Peninsula all the way up to Williamsburg. Other routes travel to Smithfield. HRT's ferry service connects downtown Norfolk to Old Town Portsmouth. Additional services include an HOV express bus to the Norfolk Naval Base, paratransit services, park-and-ride lots, and the Norfolk Electric Trolley, which provides service in the downtown area.
The Tide light rail service began operations in August 2011. The light rail is a starter route running along the southern portion of Norfolk, commencing at Newtown Road and passing through stations serving areas such as Norfolk State University and Harbor Park before going through the heart of downtown Norfolk and terminating at Sentara Norfolk General Hospital.
Hampton Roads Transportation, Inc. dispatches Black and White Cabs of Norfolk, Yellow Cab of Norfolk and Norfolk Checker Cab.

Utilities
Water and sewer services are provided by the city's Department of Utilities. Norfolk receives its electricity from Dominion Virginia Power which has local sources including the Chesapeake Energy Center (a gas power plant), coal-fired plants in Chesapeake and Southampton County, and the Surry Nuclear Power Plant. Norfolk-headquartered Virginia Natural Gas, a subsidiary of AGL Resources, distributes natural gas to the city from storage plants in James City County and Chesapeake.

Norfolk's water quality has been recognized one of the cleanest water systems in the United States and ranked as the fourth best in the United States by Men's Health. The city of Norfolk has a tremendous capacity for clean fresh water. The city owns nine reservoirs: Lake Whitehurst, Little Creek Reservoir, Lake Lawson, Lake Smith, Lake Wright, Lake Burnt Mills, Western Branch Reservoir, Lake Prince and Lake Taylor. The Virginia tidewater area has grown faster than the local freshwater supply. The river water has always been salty, and the fresh groundwater is no longer available in most areas. Currently, water for the cities of Chesapeake and Virginia Beach is pumped from Lake Gaston (which straddles the Virginia-North Carolina border) into the City of Norfolk's reservoir system and then diverted to the City of Chesapeake for treatment by the City of Chesapeake. Virginia Beach's portion of water is treated by the City of Norfolk at Moores Bridges water treatment plant and then piped into Virginia Beach. Much of its follows the former right-of-way of an abandoned portion of the Virginian Railway. It is capable of pumping 60 million gallons of water per day; Virginia Beach and Chesapeake are partners in the project.

The city provides wastewater services for residents and transports wastewater to the regional Hampton Roads Sanitation District treatment plants.

Healthcare

Because of the prominence of the Naval Medical Center Portsmouth and the Hampton VA Medical Center in Hampton, Norfolk has had a strong role in medicine. Norfolk is served by Sentara Norfolk General Hospital, Sentara Leigh Hospital, and Bon Secours DePaul Medical Center. The city is also home to the Children's Hospital of The King's Daughters and Lake Taylor Transitional Care Hospital.

Norfolk is home to Eastern Virginia Medical School (EVMS), which is known for its specialists in diabetes, dermatology, and obstetrics. It achieved international fame on March 1, 1980, when Drs. Georgianna and Howard Jones opened the first in vitro fertilization clinic in the U.S. at EVMS. The country's first in-vitro test-tube baby was born there in December 1981.

The international headquarters of Operation Smile, a nonprofit organization that specializes in repairing facial deformities in underprivileged children from around the globe, is located in the city.

Physicians for Peace, a non-profit that focuses on providing training and education to medical professionals in the developing world, is based in Norfolk.

Notable people

 Jimmy Archey, jazz trombonist 1920s–1960s
 Ella Josephine Baker, African-American civil rights and human rights activist
 Steve Bannon, former executive chair of Breitbart News and former White House Chief Strategist under U.S. President Donald Trump
 Michael Basnight, NFL player
 Zinn Beck, MLB infielder, managed Norfolk Tars in 1928
 David S. Bill III, U.S. Navy rear admiral
 Aline Elizabeth Black, African-American educator
 Gary U.S. Bonds, rhythm & blues singer
 Martha Haines Butt (1833–1871), author, suffragist
 Elizabeth Jordan Carr, the first baby in the United States conceived by in vitro fertilization, born at Sentara Norfolk General Hospital in 1981
 William Harvey Carney, soldier, Medal of Honor recipient
 Kam Chancellor, safety for NFL's Seattle Seahawks
 Clarence Clemons, saxophonist with Bruce Springsteen's E Street Band 
 Matt Coleman III, college basketball player for Texas Longhorns, NBA player
 Michael Cuddyer, professional baseball player
 James Joseph Dresnok, American soldier who defected to North Korea after the Korean War
 Rob Estes, actor
 Samuel Face, inventor
 Hap Farber, football player
 Ryan Farish, musician, electronic producer
 Florian-Ayala Fauna, artist, musician
 Joseph T. Fitzpatrick, Virginia State Senator
 Stephen Furst, actor
 Grant Gustin, actor, The Flash, Glee
Blanche Hecht Consolvo Cariaggi, singer, Italian countess
 Allan C. Hill, founder of the Great American Circus
 A. Byron Holderby Jr., Chief of Chaplains of the U.S. Navy
 Jalyn Holmes, defensive tackle for the Minnesota Vikings
 Louis Isaac Jaffe (18881950), editorial page editor of the Virginian-Pilot, Pulitzer Prize winner
 Knucks James, second baseman in Negro league baseball
 Hester C. Jeffrey, suffragette
 Chris Jones, football player
 Louisa Venable Kyle, writer
 Mary Lawson, All-American Girls Professional Baseball League player
 Elaine Luria, member of the U.S. House of Representatives from Virginia's 2nd district, and former United States Navy Commander.
 Matt Maeson, musician.
 William Magee, plastic surgeon, founder of Operation Smile
 Alex Marshall, journalist and author
 Robert E. Martinez, 8th Virginia Secretary of Transportation
 Samuel Mason, Revolutionary War soldier and American outlaw
 James Michael McAdoo, basketball player at University of North Carolina 
 John Mullan, Army officer and builder of Mullan Road
 Lenda Murray, IFBB professional bodybuilder
 Thurop Van Orman, Film director
 Barton Myers, Architect
 Steven Newsome, arts and museum administrator
 Wayne Newton, singer and actor who resides in Las Vegas
 Norfolk Four, four US Navy men stationed at Norfolk in 1997: Danial Williams, Joseph J. Dick, Eric Wilson, and Derek Tice, and who were wrongfully convicted in 1999 and 2000 in a rape/murder case based on false confessions and sentenced to life. They were released from prison in 2009 under a conditional pardon. The last convictions were overturned in 2016, and they were granted full pardons in 2017 by Governor Terry McAuliffe. In December 2018 they received a settlement from the city and state.
 Nottz, musician, hip-hop producer
 Richard G. L. Paige, one of the first African-Americans delegates in Virginia
 John Parker, Abolitionist and inventor
 Barbara Perry, actress
 Hughie Prince, film composer and songwriter
 Ray Platte, NASCAR driver
 Emmy Raver-Lampman, actress and singer
 Leah Ray, singer and actress
 Tim Reid, actor, WKRP in Cincinnati
 Joseph Jenkins Roberts, first president of Liberia
 Larry Sabato, American political scientist
 Ed Schultz, American television and radio personality
 Rhea Seehorn, actress, Better Call Saul
 Deborah Shelton, actress, Miss Virginia USA 1970, Miss USA 1970
 Lemuel C. Shepherd Jr., Marine Corps General, Commandant of the Marine Corps, 1952-1955 
 John Wesley Shipp, actor, The Flash
 Bruce Smith, NFL defensive end for Buffalo Bills
 Keely Smith, singer and recording artist
 Joe Smith, former NBA basketball player
 Joseph Stika, Coast Guard vice admiral
 Margaret Sullavan, Oscar-nominated actress
 Timbaland, musician, hip-hop producer
 Doris Eaton Travis, dancer and actress
 Scott Travis, drummer for rock bands Racer X, Judas Priest, Fight and Thin Lizzy
 Justin Upton, MLB outfielder for Detroit Tigers
 Melvin Upton, Jr, MLB outfielder for Toronto Blue Jays
 Gene Vincent, member of Rock and Roll Hall of Fame
 Benjamin Watson, American football tight end
 Joe Weatherly, former NASCAR driver
 Pernell Whitaker, boxer, 1984 Olympic gold medalist, 4-division world champion
 Thomas Wilkins, symphony conductor
 Patrick Wilson, Golden Globe and Emmy-nominated actor
 Harold G. Wren (1921-2016), dean of three law schools
 David Wright, MLB third baseman for New York Mets
Mark Williams, NBA player for Charlotte Hornets played college basketball for Duke University
 Jake E. Lee (1957), rock guitarist

Sister cities
Norfolk's sister cities are:

Kitakyushu, Japan (1963)
Wilhelmshaven, Germany (1976)
Norfolk, England, United Kingdom (1986)
Toulon, France (1989)
Halifax, Nova Scotia, Canada (2006)
Cagayan de Oro, Philippines (2008)
Tema, Ghana (2010)
Kochi, India (2010)

Former sister cities:
Kaliningrad, Russia (1992–2022)

Wilhelmshaven is the Germany's largest military harbour and naval base and Toulon is the Europe's largest military harbour.

See also
 Hunter House Victorian Museum
 List of famous people from Hampton Roads (Norfolk)
 List of tallest buildings in Norfolk
 List of U.S. cities with large Black populations
 National Register of Historic Places listings in Norfolk, Virginia
 Norfolk Anti-Inoculation Riot of 1768
 Norfolk Convention and Visitors Bureau
 Norfolk Police Department
 Norvella Heights
 USS Norfolk, 5 ships

Notes

References

External links

 Official website
 Norfolk Convention and Visitor's Bureau
 Norfolk Historical Society

 
1682 establishments in Virginia
Populated coastal places in Virginia
Populated places established in 1682
Populated places in Hampton Roads
Port cities and towns of the United States Atlantic coast
Cities in Virginia
Virginia counties on the Chesapeake Bay
Majority-minority counties and independent cities in Virginia